The House Without a Key is a 1926 American mystery film serial directed by Spencer Gordon Bennet. It is based on the 1925 novel of the same name and is the first onscreen appearance of the fictional detective Charlie Chan, although the main stars are Allene Ray and Walter Miller. The film is now considered to be lost.

Cast
 Allene Ray as Carry Egan
 Walter Miller as John Quincy Winterclip
 E. H. Calvert as Dan Winterclip
 Betty Caldwell as Barbara Winterclip
 Natalie Warfield as Minerva Winterclip
 Jack Pratt as James Egan
 William Bailey as Harry Jennison (as William Norton Bailey)
 Frank Lackteen as Kaohla
 George Kuwa as Charlie Chan
 Harry Semels as Saladine
 Charles West as Bowker (as Charles H. West)
 John Cossar as District Attorney
 Scott Seaton as Detective
 Cliff Saum as Kennedy
 John Webb Dillion
 Shia Jung as The young Chinese girl (uncredited)

See also
 List of film serials
 List of film serials by studio

References

External links
 
 

1926 films
1926 lost films
1926 mystery films
American silent serial films
American black-and-white films
Pathé Exchange film serials
Films directed by Spencer Gordon Bennet
Charlie Chan films
Lost American films
Films based on American novels
Films based on mystery novels
American mystery films
Lost mystery films
1920s American films
Silent mystery films
Silent thriller films